Porto Rico is an old variant spelling of Puerto Rico, an unincorporated territory of the United States.

Porto Rico may also refer to:

Porto Rico, Paraná, a municipality in the state of Paraná in the Southern Region of Brazil
Porto Rico do Maranhão, a municipality in the state of Maranhão in the Northeast region of Brazil

See also
Puerto Rico (disambiguation)
Souvenir de Porto Rico